The 1937 Hong Kong Urban Council election was supposed to be held in January 1937 for the one of the two unofficial seats in the Urban Council of Hong Kong. It was supposed to be the first election of the Urban Council.

Dr. Roberto Alexandre de Castro Basto was again elected without being contested.

References
 Endacott, G. B. Government and people in Hong Kong, 1841-1962 : a constitutional history Hong Kong University Press. (1964) 
 The Hong Kong Government Gazette

Hong Kong
1937 in Hong Kong
Urban
Uncontested elections
January 1937 events
1937 elections in the British Empire